John Graham Sissons (born 20 May 1934) is an English former footballer who played as a defender. He made more than 250 appearances in the Football League for Birmingham City, Peterborough United and Walsall, and played in both legs of the 1961 Inter-Cities Fairs Cup Final, which Birmingham lost to Roma. For Birmingham, he was used as Trevor Smith's deputy at centre half, and later replaced George Allen at left back.

Honours
Birmingham City
 Inter-Cities Fairs Cup runner-up: 1960–61

Notes

References

1934 births
Living people
Sportspeople from Chester-le-Street
Footballers from County Durham
English footballers
Association football defenders
Birmingham City F.C. players
Peterborough United F.C. players
Walsall F.C. players
Stourbridge F.C. players
English Football League players